Prellwitz is a surname of Prussian origin. Notable people with the surname include:

 Aaron Prellwitz, music producer for albums like Get Lonely
 Edith Mitchill Prellwitz (1865–1944), American artist
 Henry Prellwitz (1865–1940), American artist
 Karin von Prellwitz, cofounder of Eulama literary agency

See also
 Przelewice, Wałcz County, a village in northwestern Poland whose German name is Prellwitz
 Prillwitz, a village in Germany